Environmental technology (envirotech) or green technology (greentech), also known as clean technology (cleantech), is the application of one or more of environmental science, green chemistry, environmental monitoring and electronic devices to monitor, model and conserve the natural environment and resources, and to curb the negative impacts of human involvement. The term is also used to describe sustainable energy generation technologies such as photovoltaics, wind turbines, etc.  Sustainable development is the core of environmental technologies.  The term environmental technologies is also used to describe a class of electronic devices that can promote sustainable management of resources.

Purification and waste management

Examples
Biofiltration
Bioreactor
Bioremediation
Desalination
Thermal depolymerization
Composting toilet
Pyrolysis

Water purification

Water purification: The whole idea/concept of having dirt/germ/pollution free water flowing throughout the environment. Many other phenomena lead from this concept of purification of water. Water pollution is the main enemy of this concept, and various campaigns and activists have been organized around the world to help purify water.

Air purification
Air purification:  Basic and common green plants can be grown indoors to keep the air fresh because all plants remove CO2 and convert it into oxygen. The best examples are: Dypsis lutescens, Sansevieria trifasciata, and Epipremnum aureum. Besides using the plants themselves, some species of bacteria can also be added to the leaves of these plants to help remove toxic gases, such as toluene.

Sewage treatment
Sewage treatment is conceptually similar to water purification. Sewage treatments are very important as they purify water per levels of pollution. The most polluted water is not used for anything, and the least polluted water is supplied to places where water is used affluently. It may lead to various other concepts of environmental protection, sustainability, etc.

Environmental remediation
Environmental remediation is the removal of pollutants or contaminants for the general protection of the environment. This is accomplished by various chemical, biological, and bulk methods.

Solid waste management
Solid waste management is the purification, consumption, reuse, disposal and treatment of solid waste that is undertaken by the government or the ruling bodies of a city/town.

Sustainable energy

Concerns over pollution and greenhouse gases have spurred the search for sustainable alternatives to our current fuel use. The global reduction of greenhouse gases requires the adoption of energy conservation as well as sustainable generation. That environmental harm reduction involves global changes such as:

 reducing air pollution and methane from biomass 
 virtually eliminating fossil fuels for vehicles, heat, and electricity, left in the ground. 
 widespread use of public transport, battery and fuel cell vehicles 
 more wind/solar/water generated electricity 
 reducing peak demands with carbon taxes and time of use pricing.

Since fuel used by industry and transportation account for the majority of world demand, by investing in conservation and efficiency (using less fuel), pollution and greenhouse gases from these two sectors can be reduced around the globe. Advanced energy efficient electric motor (and electric generator) technology that are cost effective to encourage their application, such as variable speed generators and efficient energy use, can reduce the amount of carbon dioxide (CO2) and sulfur dioxide (SO2) that would otherwise be introduced to the atmosphere, if electricity were generated using fossil fuels. Greasestock is an event held yearly in Yorktown Heights, New York which is one of the largest showcases of environmental technology in the United States. Some scholars have expressed concern that the implementation of new environmental technologies in highly-developed national economies may cause economic and social disruption in less-developed economies.

Examples

Hydroelectricity
Wind power
Wind turbine
Ocean thermal energy conversion
Solar power
Photovoltaic
Wave energy
Electric vehicle
Heat pump
Hydrogen fuel cell
Green computing
Energy conservation
Doubly fed electric machine
Energy saving modules

Renewable energy

Renewable energy is the energy that can be replenished easily. For years we have been using sources such as wood, sun, water, etc. for means for producing energy. Energy that can be produced by natural objects like the sun, wind, etc. is considered to be renewable. Technologies that have been in usage include wind power, hydropower, solar energy, geothermal energy, and biomass/bioenergy.

Energy conservation
Energy conservation is the utilization of devices that require smaller amounts of energy in order to reduce the consumption of electricity. Reducing the use of electricity causes less fossil fuels to be burned to provide that electricity.

eGain forecasting
Egain forecasting is a method using forecasting technology to predict the future weather's impact on a building. By adjusting the heat based on the weather forecast, the system eliminates redundant use of heat, thus reducing the energy consumption and the emission of greenhouse gases.

Education
Courses aimed at developing graduates with some specific skills in environmental systems or environmental technology are becoming more common and fall into three broads classes:
Environmental Engineering or Environmental Systems courses oriented towards a civil engineering approach in which structures and the landscape are constructed to blend with or protect the environment;
Environmental chemistry, sustainable chemistry or environmental chemical engineering courses oriented towards understanding the effects (good and bad) of chemicals in the environment.  Such awards can focus on mining processes, pollutants and commonly also cover biochemical processes;
Environmental technology courses oriented towards producing electronic, electrical or electrotechnology graduates capable of developing devices and artefacts able to monitor, measure, model and control environmental impact, including monitoring and managing energy generation from renewable sources, and developing novel energy generation technologies.

See also

Appropriate technology
Bright green environmentalism
Eco-innovation
Ecological modernization
Ecotechnology
Environmentally friendly
Green development
Groasis Waterboxx
Information and communication technologies for environmental sustainability
Pulser Pump
Sustainable design
Sustainable energy
Sustainable engineering
Sustainable living
Sustainable technologies
Technology for sustainable development
The All-Earth Ecobot Challenge
WIPO GREEN

References

Further reading

External links

Bright green environmentalism